The Animation Masters Summit (AMS) is an animation industry conference organized every year by Toonz Animation in India. The event brings together animation experts from across the world to discuss trends in the animation industry. This event is notoriously well attended by big names in this industry. The event venue is in Trivandrum, the capital city of Kerala in India. The speakers, known as 'masters' of the event, share their expertise and experiences with animation professionals and aspiring young talent. The event happens during April/May every year, from 1999. The event is a cross-section of mastery in animation, visual effects, and the media industry.

The summit also includes ‘Flying Elephant Competition’ which is an animation and short film competition constituted to recognize upcoming talents in the film industry. The awards are given away in Animation Short Films, Animation TV Feature & Series, Live Action Short Films, and Short Film-Student categories.

Some of the industry experts who were speakers in previous editions of the event include Ram Mohan , Olivier Jean-Marie, Shilpa Ranade, Kireet Khurana, Gitanjali Rao, Sabu Cyril, Charuvi Agrawal, Rajiv Chilaka, V. A. Shrikumar Menon and Anjum Rajabali.  The summit used to have talks, interactive workshops, and panel discussions covering the industry from both Indian and international perspectives.

References

,External links
 Animation Masters Summit - the official summit website

Animation industry
International conferences
Annual events in India
Animation events